Krasowo-Częstki  is a village in the administrative district of Gmina Nowe Piekuty, within Wysokie Mazowieckie County, Podlaskie Voivodeship, in north-eastern Poland.

During World War II, on 17 July 1943, Nazi Germans murdered 257 Polish citizens of the village and burned down their properties.

This was the triggering event for the Raid on Mittenheide.

References

Villages in Wysokie Mazowieckie County